Bumthang may refer to:
 Bumthang (town), officially Jakar
 Bumthang District
 Bumthang River
 Bumthang Kingdom
 Bumthang people
 Bumthang language
 Bumthang Province
 Bumthang Valley